The Free Imperial City of Aachen, also known in English by its French name of Aix-la-Chapelle and today known simply as Aachen, was a Free Imperial City and spa of the Holy Roman Empire west of Cologne and southeast of the Low Countries, in the Lower Rhenish–Westphalian Circle. The pilgrimages, the Coronation of the Holy Roman Emperor, flourishing industries and the privileges conferred by various emperors made it one of the most prosperous market towns of the Holy Roman Empire.

History
In 1166, Aachen was given imperial immediacy and declared a Free Imperial City of the Holy Roman Empire by Emperor Frederick I, also known as Barbarossa, by means of the Charlemagne Privilege (Karlsprivileg). Aachen played a part in the league which kept the peace between 1351 and 1387 between the Meuse and the Rhine. In 1450 a rebellion led to the acceptance of the guilds to a share in local government. In the 16th century Aachen began declining in importance and prosperity. It was too close to the frontier with the Kingdom of France to be safe, and too far from the Holy Roman Empire to be convenient as a capital city. In 1562 the Imperial election and Coronation of the Holy Roman Emperor Maximilian II took place at Frankfurt, a precedent followed until the end of the Holy Roman Empire. The Protestant Reformation brought  trouble to Aachen. In 1580 Protestantism got the upper hand; an Imperial ban resulted and was imposed in 1598 by Ernest of Bavaria, archbishop-elector of Cologne. A religious relapse of the city led to a new Imperial ban by Emperor Matthias in 1613, and in 1614 Ambrogio Spinola's Spanish Army forced the recalcitrant city back into the Catholic fold. In 1656 a great fire destroyed 4,000 houses. This calamity completed the ruin started by the Thirty Years' War.

Aachen hosted several Peace conferences, those ending the War of Devolution and the War of the Austrian Succession. By the Treaty of Aix-la-Chapelle, dated 2 May 1668, Louis XIV of France was compelled, by the Triple Alliance between Kingdom of England, the Dutch Republic, and the Kingdom of Sweden, to abandon the War of Devolution against Southern Netherlands. The treaty forced the King to restore the County of Burgundy, which he had conquered, and to be content with owning twelve Flemish fortifications. The second Treaty of Aix-la-Chapelle, dated 18 October 1748, ended the War of the Austrian Succession. By the terms of the Treaty of Campo Formio, Aachen was incorporated in the French First Republic as chief town in the Roer Department. Later, the Congress of Vienna gave Aachen to the Kingdom of Prussia.

See also
Timeline of Aachen

References

History of Aachen
1166 establishments in Europe
1801 disestablishments in the Holy Roman Empire
Aachen